The men's 400 metre freestyle competition at the 1997 Pan Pacific Swimming Championships took place on August 12 at the NISHI Civic Pool.  The last champion was Daniel Kowalski of Australia.

This race consisted of eight lengths of the pool, with all eight being in the freestyle stroke.

Records
Prior to this competition, the existing world and Pan Pacific records were as follows:

Results
All times are in minutes and seconds.

Heats
The first round was held on August 12.

B Final
The B final was held on August 12.

A Final
The A final was held on August 12.

References

1997 Pan Pacific Swimming Championships